Bruce Douglas Foxton (born 1 September 1955) is an English singer, songwriter and musician.

Foxton's music career spans more than 40 years. He came to prominence in the late 1970s as bassist and backing vocalist of  mod revival band the Jam. He occasionally performed the lead vocals, such as on the songs "News of the World", "David Watts" and "Smithers-Jones". After the band's break-up, he pursued a brief solo career releasing one studio album, Touch Sensitive, in 1984. The album's single "Freak" became a UK Top 20 hit in 1983. He played in several bands, including Sharp with former Jam member Rick Buckler, before joining Stiff Little Fingers in 1990.

After leaving SLF in 2007, Foxton officially joined Rick Buckler and members of his tribute band, The Gift, to tour under the name From the Jam.

Early life and education
Bruce Douglas Foxton was born the youngest of three boys on 1 September 1955, in Woking, Surrey, England, to parents Henry and Helen. He grew up at 126 Albert Drive, Sheerwater where he was born, and attended Sheerwater Junior and Secondary where he showed great skill in football and technical drawing. In 1972, he left school to work with his brother Derek at a printing firm. While there, he formed a band with his colleagues at work but he abandoned the project out of frustration due to lack of progress and instead chose to join The Jam, although at the beginning he had doubts about the band's frequent covers of old hits.

Career

Together with drummer Rick Buckler he formed the rhythm section for The Jam, which was fronted by singer, guitarist and songwriter Paul Weller. Foxton initially joined the band as lead guitarist (Weller played bass), but the pair switched roles following the departure of guitarist Steve Brookes. During his time with the band Foxton performed lead vocals on several tracks, most notably the singles "David Watts" (a cover of a Kinks track) and "News of the World", which was his own composition. Foxton also penned a number of other tracks, the most notable being "Smithers-Jones", done as a straightforward rock take for the B-side of "When You're Young" and later reworked with strings for the Setting Sons album.  After Foxton joined Stiff Little Fingers in 1990 the band would regularly perform the song live.

Whilst in The Jam, Foxton discovered the new wave band the Vapors and offered them two appearances on the May 1979 tour of The Jam. The band was managed by John Weller, Paul's father. The Vapors enjoyed greater success in the US than The Jam, with the Top 40 single "Turning Japanese", but broke up shortly thereafter.

After The Jam broke-up in 1982, Foxton pursued a brief solo career and released the studio album, Touch Sensitive, in 1984. The album's single "Freak" became a UK Top 20 hit in 1983. He had other minor UK hits in 1983 and 1984 with the singles "This Is the Way" and "It Makes Me Wonder", and played in several bands, including Sharp with former Jam member Rick Buckler, before joining Stiff Little Fingers.

He stayed with Stiff Little Fingers for 15 years, during which time they recorded five albums, namely, Flags and Emblems, Get a Life, Tinderbox, Hope Street and Guitar and Drum. During his time with the band, he wrote and co-wrote several tracks and, along with lead singer Jake Burns, managed the band for a while after Russel Emmanuel relinquished the role.

In 1994, Foxton and Buckler collaborated on Our Story, a biography of their years in The Jam. It was around this time he became a source of fascination for comedians Stewart Lee and Richard Herring on their BBC Radio 1 music shows.

In 2006, Foxton toured with Bruce Watson, Mark Brzezicki and Simon Townshend as the Casbah Club. When this band supported the Who in the UK, Foxton encountered Paul Weller backstage for the first time in nearly 25 years.

In February 2007, Foxton and Buckler announced they would be touring together again as From the Jam, with members of Buckler's Jam tribute band the Gift. In March 2008, they toured Australia and New Zealand – a first for Foxton and Buckler. A complete concert (recorded at the London Astoria in December 2007) was released on DVD in 2008 through the London-based indie label Invisible Hands Music.

On 5 May 2009, Foxton attended the funeral of Paul Weller's father John, who had been instrumental in The Jam's success. Foxton played bass and contributed backing vocals on the songs "Fast Car/Slow Traffic" and "She Speaks" included on Weller's solo album, Wake Up the Nation, released in April 2010. On 25 May 2010, at the Royal Albert Hall, Foxton joined Weller onstage for the first time in 28 years, to perform three songs, "Fast Car/Slow Traffic", "The Eton Rifles" and "The Butterfly Collector".

On 1 October 2012, Foxton released Back in the Room, his first album in 30 years. It was funded by fans through PledgeMusic and released on Absolute via Universal. Co-written with From the Jam singer Russell Hastings and featuring drummer Mark Brzezicki, guest musicians included Paul Weller. Weller performed on three tracks, the single "Number Six", "Window Shopping" and "Coming on Strong".

In November 2016, Smash the Clock, a second collaboration with Russell Hastings, was released on Absolute to generally favourable reviews. Once again it featured a number of well known guest musicians, including Paul Weller.  "Get Ready to Rock" online magazine/blog in their review wrote "Foxton and Hastings may not thank me for saying it, but this is probably the best album Paul Weller never made" In December 2017, Foxton released the album From The Jam Live! with Hastings. In 2020, Foxton and Hastings celebrated the 40th anniversary of The Jam’s 4th album Setting Sons with a From The Jam tour that involved The Vapors as the original support act on The Jam's 1979 Setting Sons tour. Because of the Covid pandemic, the tour was eventually postponed to 2021.

Personal life
In early 2009, Foxton's wife of 25 years Pat, who had worked in public relations for United Artists and CBS, died of breast cancer.

Bruce is now married to Kate Foxton (nee Farrow).

Discography

With The Jam

Solo
Studio albums

Singles

References

External links
Official website

1955 births
20th-century English singers
21st-century English singers
20th-century English bass guitarists
21st-century English bass guitarists
English rock bass guitarists
Male bass guitarists
English rock musicians
English male singers
English new wave musicians
English songwriters
Living people
Male new wave singers
Mod revival musicians
Arista Records artists
People from Woking
Stiff Little Fingers members
The Jam members
Casbah Club members